Hans List (30 April 1896 in Graz, capital of Austria's federal province Styria – 10 September 1996 in Graz) was a technical scientist and inventor and entrepreneur.

After earning a doctorate in engineering at the Technical University in Graz, Hans List was appointed to the Tongji University in China (1926–1932), followed by teaching positions back home in Graz (1932–1941) and Dresden, Germany (until 1945). His research work yielded sensational insights into functionality and improvement of Diesel motors, and of combustion engines in general.

This is also the main field of work for the company he founded in 1948 on the basis of the engineering consultant office he had opened 1946: "Anstalt für Verbrennungskraftmaschinen (institute for combustion engines) Prof. Dr. Hans List" (Austria is, or at least was, somewhat addicted to titles, due to habits trained during its imperial past), abbreviated to AVL. This firm soon started to operate globally in the area of developing combustion engines, but also measuring techniques and modelling techniques. Roughly one thousand patents prove the company's competence, and numerous subsidiary companies round the globe stand for its economical success.

In 1969, AVL developed a  test bed which allowed for comprehensive data acquisition and analysis. Throughout the 1970s, AVL's diesel engine performance and data acquisition capabilities continued to improve, while its PUMA test bed software began to give the company an international reputation. Since 1979, the founder's son Helmut List (born 20 December 1941) runs it under the current name "AVL List GmbH (= Ltd.)". After more innovations and more success in the 1980s, AVL opened its AST (Advanced Simulation Technology) division in 1987. Helmut List also is eponym for the Helmut-List-Halle, a large multi-purpose cultural venue, a.o. serving for many events during the annual Styrian Autumn festival. As the hall particularly features ideal acoustic conditions for classic concerts, one of its estimators is a worldwide renowned Mozart expert who grew up in Graz, conductor Nikolaus Harnoncourt.

Among the many fields within the company's original business sector of combustion engines (and related power transmitting techniques), within the last decades AVL especially drew the technically interested public's attention by very special skills. One is developing and improving 4-wheel-drive systems. Another is car sound design, for practically all car producers round the globe – that's why the generally more silently running vehicles can be distinguished by make simply whilst listening, with one restriction: the sounds are sensitively matched to the local aural expectations, therefore they sound differently in Tokyo, Seoul, Detroit, NYC, Berlin and Vienna or Rome. And a sport roadster's sound must be rock opera scores distant from that of a rather quiet versatile city car of the same make or a cross-anywhere riding yet highly comfortable suv, and symphony scores away from a same-company elegantly cruising limo's almost inaudibly canorousness.

Decorations and awards 
 Austrian Decoration for Science and Art
 Honorary Ring of Styria
 Wilhelm Exner Medal (1971).
 Honorary Citizen of the City of Graz
 Honorary doctorate from the Technical University of Graz (1963)

See also 
 List of Austrian companies

References

External links 
 AVL List GmbH (GmbH = Ltd.)
 Helmut-List-Halle
 Steirischer Herbst (Styrian Autumn festival), also in English: please click on the "English" link (right top) yourself, as the subdomain's URL contains the year and thus will change annually

1896 births
1996 deaths
Engineers from Graz
Austrian automotive pioneers
Austrian centenarians
20th-century Austrian inventors
Men centenarians
Recipients of the Austrian Decoration for Science and Art